A Long Goodbye (Japanese: 長いお別れ) is a 2019 Japanese family drama film, directed by Ryōta Nakano.

Plot 
A family deals with the 70 year old father, who informs his wife and daughters that he has Alzheimer's disease. They react differently to as his illness progresses, but realize
there are some things he will not forget.

The story looks at the drama of the family members' own individual challenges, as they come to deal with their own father's illness.

Production 
The movie was released on May 31, 2019 and distributed by Asmik Ace Entertainment.

Cast 
Yū Aoi as Fumi Higashi
Yuko Takeuchi as Mari Imamura (née Higashi)
Tsutomu Yamazaki as Shōhei Higashi
Chieko Matsubara as Yōko Higashi
Yukiya Kitamura as Arata Imamura
Tomoya Nakamura as Michihiko Iwata
Rairu Sugita as Takashi Imamura
Kurumi Shimizu as Mio Konishi
Akiko Kurano
Takumi Matsuzawa

References

External links

2019 films
Films about Alzheimer's disease
Films about families
Films based on Japanese novels
Japanese drama films
2010s Japanese-language films
2019 drama films
2010s Japanese films